McCullen v. Coakley, 573 U.S. 464 (2014), is a United States Supreme Court case involving a First Amendment challenge to the validity of a Massachusetts law establishing  fixed buffer zones around facilities where abortions were performed.

The law – part of the Reproductive Health Care Facilities Act – barred non-exempt individuals from entering or remaining "on a public way or sidewalk adjacent to a reproductive health care facility within a radius of 35 feet". The Court unanimously held that the law violated the First Amendment to the United States Constitution, as applied to Massachusetts through the Fourteenth Amendment.

Background 
In 1994, the United States Congress passed the Freedom of Access to Clinic Entrances Act, which, among other things, prohibited the use of physical force toward or physical obstruction of a person seeking to obtain or provide reproductive health services.

In 2000, Massachusetts passed the Reproductive Health Care Facilities Act, which was broadly modeled on laws upheld by the Supreme Court in Hill v. Colorado. Within an  radius around the entrances or driveways of reproductive health care facilities, the Act prohibited approaching within six feet of another person "for the purpose of passing a leaflet or handbill to, displaying a sign to, or engaging in oral protest, education, or counseling with such other person", unless this was done with the person's consent. The Act also contained a prohibition against obstructing a person who was entering or leaving such a facility.

In 2007, the Act was amended. The 18-foot no approach zone was replaced with a  buffer zone around reproductive health care facilities. The amended law prohibited non-exempt individuals from "knowingly enter[ing] or remain[ing] on a public way or sidewalk adjacent to a reproductive health care facility within a radius of 35 feet". Exempt individuals included: people leaving and entering the facility, employees and agents of the facility within the scope of their employment, law enforcement and other first responders, and persons using the "public sidewalk or street right-of-way adjacent to such facility solely for the purpose of reaching a destination other than the facility".

The amended Act was challenged by seven individuals who engaged in "sidewalk counseling" outside Planned Parenthood clinics in Boston, Worcester, and Springfield, Massachusetts under the First and Fourteenth Amendments.

Opinion of the Court 
Chief Justice John Roberts delivered the opinion of the Court, writing that: "The buffer zones burden substantially more speech than necessary to achieve [Massachusetts'] asserted interests." He stated that there were alternatives available to Massachusetts that "appear capable of serving its interests, without excluding individuals from areas historically open for speech and debate". Further, he stated:
Although respondents claim that Massachusetts 'tried other laws already on the books', they identify not a single prosecution brought under those laws within at least the last 17 years. And while they also claim that the Commonwealth 'tried injunctions', the last injunctions they cite date to the 1990s. In short, the Commonwealth has not shown that it seriously undertook to address the problem with less intrusive tools readily available to it. Nor has it shown that it considered different methods that other jurisdictions have found effective.

Roberts evaluated the law on the basis that it was content-neutral and did not discriminate based on viewpoint. The Court maintained the intermediate scrutiny standard, as laid out in Hill v. Colorado, for content- and viewpoint-neutral regulations.

Justice Antonin Scalia (with whom Justices Anthony Kennedy and Clarence Thomas agreed) concurred in the judgment but disagreed with the reasons of the Chief Justice. In Scalia's view, the law was content-based, the Court should have applied strict scrutiny, and the law failed that stricter standard.

Justice Samuel Alito also filed an opinion concurring in the judgment, but disagreed with Roberts' opinion that the law was viewpoint-neutral. Alito considered that the law "blatantly discriminates based on viewpoint": a "sidewalk counselor" would not be permitted to enter the zone in order to approach a woman and criticize the clinic, but an employee of the clinic could approach the same woman to encourage her to come inside.

See also 
 List of United States Supreme Court cases involving the First Amendment

References

Further reading
 McCullen v. Coakley - Harvard Law Review

External links 
 

United States Supreme Court cases
2014 in United States case law
United States reproductive rights case law
United States Free Speech Clause case law
History of Worcester, Massachusetts
Planned Parenthood litigation
United States Supreme Court cases of the Roberts Court
Alliance Defending Freedom litigation